G. commutata may refer to:

 Gagea commutata, a plant with linear leaves
 Grevillea commutata, a flowering plant
 Gyroscala commutata, a sea snail